Božena Böhmová (22 February 1925 – 25 July 2020) was a Czech actress. Among others she is known for Žena za pultem.

Böhmová was born in the town of Přísečná on February 22, 1925. After living in Prague during the course of WWII, she would end up joining an acting ensemble Obratník that ran street theatre plays. She then decided to improve ensemble theatre in the country by going to Zlín in 1947.

References

20th-century Czech actresses
Czech actresses
1925 births
2020 deaths
People from Český Krumlov District
Place of death missing